Candace Glendenning (born 9 August 1953) is a retired English actress, known for her work in the horror film genre in the 1970s as a "scream queen". She also had a long and diverse career in British television throughout the late 60s to early 80s.

Biography

She began her career as a child actress being cast in one of the headlining roles of the critically acclaimed six-part children's serial drama, The Tyrant King (1968). She also had an un-credited role as a schoolgirl in the Oscar winning film adaptation of The Prime of Miss Jean Brody (1969), opposite Maggie Smith.

As the swinging sixties came to a close, Glendenning blossomed into a striking Vivien Leigh type of beauty. In 1971, she played the Grand Duchess Maria Romanov in the Oscar winning film, Nicholas and Alexandra (1971). Glendenning and her co-stars Ania Marson, Lynne Frederick, and Fiona Fullerton headlined the film's press tour. That same year, at the age of 18, she auditioned for the role of Clare of Assisi in the Franco Zeffirelli production of Brother Sun, Sister Moon (1972), but was considered to be "too exotic looking" for the part.

Represented by the top A-list agency Hazel Malone Management, she broke out of her ingenue character mould by appearing in two slasher horror films back to back. The first was a small role in the Tower Of Evil (1972), and despite her part being small, the image of her character running nude, covered in blood, and carrying a dagger, featured prominently in the film's promotional material (most notably the posters and trailers). The film was a critical and commercial flop and dismissed as a mere exploitation film.

Her next appearance was a supporting role in The Flesh and Blood Show (1972). Like Tower of Evil, this film also featured nudity and a great deal of violence. Although the film was better received, it failed to showcase her properly and break her out into more prestigious roles. Afterwards, film offers were in short supply for Glendenning.

Despite the lack of offers for films, she had success working as a television actress. In 1972, she appeared in an episode of the costume drama, The Strauss Family. That same year she guest starred in an episode of The Main Chance, where she played a spiritual hippy. From 1971 to 1973, she appeared in three episodes of the BBC television anthology series, BBC Play of the Month. She also garnered critical acclaim for her role in an episode of the slapstick comedy series Ripping Yarns. Her most memorable and cult followed television role was on an episode of the science fiction series, Blake's 7, in which she played Rashel, a liberated bond-slave.

She made her final feature film appearance in the 1976 independent horror film, Satan's Slave. The film's director, Norman J Warren, personally sought her out to be in the project, having been an admirer of her previous horror films. This role would turn out to be her biggest starring role to date. In this film she played an independent and spirited young woman who, after surviving a car accident in which her parents are seemingly killed, is taken in by her uncle and cousin (played by Michael Gough and Martin Potter), unaware that they are both necromancers who intend to sacrifice her to resurrect the spirit of a supernaturally-gifted ancestor. Despite the production value and good script, the content in certain scenes still fell into the category of exploitation. The film's title was also later changed and downgraded to Satan's Slave (1976). Although her performance was well received by critics, the film itself was panned and failed to turn a profit.

After the failure of her last theatrical film, she continued to work steadily in various television roles. But the majority of her appearances were small, sparse, and at times would go virtually unnoticed. In 1980, she appeared on five episodes of the BBC series Flesh and Blood, in which she played an elegant secretary. She was also reunited with Michael Jayston, who had played her father in Nicholas and Alexandra nearly ten years before. Glendenning's last role was a guest spot in a 1983 episode of the medical drama series, Angels. As offers for acting roles began to dry up around, she devoted herself to other pursuits and quietly retired from acting.

Filmography
The Prime of Miss Jean Brodie (1969) as Schoolgirl 
Up Pompeii (1971) as Stone Girl
Nicholas and Alexandra (1971) as Maria
Tower of Evil (1972) as Penelope "Penny" Read
The Flesh and Blood Show (1972) as Sarah
Diamonds on Wheels (1974) as Elizabeth
Satan's Slave (1976) as Catherine York

Television appearances
The Tyrant King (6 episodes, 1968)
The Expert (1 episode, 1971)
The Main Chance (1 episode, 1972)
The Strauss Family (1 episode, 1972)
BBC Play of the Month (2 episodes, 1972–73)
Dixon of Dock Green (1 episode, 1975)
Looking For Clancy (1 episode, 1975)
Disneyland (3 episodes, 1974)
Ten from the Twenties (1 episode, 1975)
Play for Today (1 episode, 1976)
Scene (2 episodes, 1976)
Ripping Yarns (1 episode, 1977)
Rainbow (1 episode, 1977)
Blake's 7 (1 episode, 1979)
Flesh and Blood (6 episodes, 1980–82)
Angels (1 episode, 1982)

References

External links

1953 births
Living people
Actresses from London
English child actresses
English film actresses
English television actresses